Phoenix Command is a 1986 role-playing game system published by Leading Edge Games, and copyrighted by Barry Nakazono and David McKenzie. Various versions of the system featured in the games Morning Star Missions, Living Steel, and Aliens Adventure Game.

Phoenix Command has extremely detailed rules in an attempt to realistically simulate combat. The game utilizes lookup tables which resolve injuries to specific digits, organs, and bones, and simulates the physics of different attacks, such as bullets with different velocities. Simplified rules were used for most of the movie tie-ins as well as Living Steel.

The manuals have quotes and extra information in the margins, many of which are darkly humorous. The original game contained a 56-page spiral bound rule book, 32 page modern military weapon data supplement, reference tables, blank character sheets and one ten sided die. 

Additional supplements included the Hand to Hand Combat System (1988), World War 2 Weapon Data Supplement (1988), Wild West Weapon Data Supplement (1989), Civilian Weapon Data Supplement (1987), Living Steel Power Armour Sourcebook (1991), Advanced Damage Tables (1987) and High Tech Weapon Data Supplement (1987) amongst others.

Design philosophy
In the designers' own words, Phoenix Command is "...designed to be truly realistic; not complex, or deadly, but simply a representation of what really happens to people." The goal of realism made the rules very complex for a role playing game, to the point where Phoenix Command is regularly held up as an example of the extreme end of RPG complexity.

Reviews
Different Worlds #47

References

External links

Leading Edge Games games
Military role-playing games
Role-playing games introduced in 1986